Phos boucheti is a species of sea snail, a marine gastropod mollusk in the family Nassariidae, the true whelks and the like.

Description

Distribution
This marine species occurs in the Coral Sea.

References

 Fraussen K. 2003. Three new deep-water species of Phos Montfort, 1810 (Gastropoda: Buccinidae) from the South Pacific. Novapex 4(4): 111-118

External links
 Galindo, L. A.; Puillandre, N.; Utge, J.; Lozouet, P.; Bouchet, P. (2016). The phylogeny and systematics of the Nassariidae revisited (Gastropoda, Buccinoidea). Molecular Phylogenetics and Evolution. 99: 337-353

Nassariidae
Gastropods described in 2003